Minuscule 788 (in the Gregory-Aland numbering of New Testament manuscripts), ε1033 (in the von Soden numbering of New Testament manuscripts), is a Greek minuscule manuscript of the New Testament written on parchment. Using the study of comparative handwriting styles (palaeography), it has been assigned to the 11th century.

Description 
The manuscript is a codex (precursor to the modern book), containing the text of the four Gospels on 219 parchment leaves (sized ),, with only one gap (John 21:20-25). The text is written in two columns per page, 26 lines per page.

The text is divided according to the chapters (known as  / kephalaia), whose numbers are given in the margin, with their chapter titles (known as  / titloi) at the top of the pages. There is also another division according to the smaller Ammonian Sections (in Mark there are 234 sections, ending at 16:9), with references to the Eusebian Canons (an early system of dividing the four Gospels into different sections). There is also a Gospel Harmony included at the bottom of the pages in the Gospel of John.

It contains the Epistula ad Carpianum (a letter from the early church writer Eusebius of Caesarea, outlying his gospel harmony system, his chapter divisions of the four gospels, and their purpose), tables of contents (also known as κεφαλαια / kephalaia) before each Gospel, Prolegomena (introductions) to the four Gospels, lectionary markings (to indicate what verse was to be read on a specific day in the churches yearly calendar) in the margin, liturgical books with hagiographies, a Synaxarion (a list of saint's days), and Menologion (a list of readings to be read each calendar month), subscriptions at the end of each of the Gospels, and pictures. The manuscript also includes lists of how many phrases (known as  / rhemata) are used in each gospel, and how many lines (known as  / stichoi) are written in each gospel, but after the end of each Gospel's table of contents, as opposed to the usual location after the end of each Gospel's text.

Text 
The Greek text of the codex has been considered as a representative of the Caesarean text-type. The text-types are groups of different New Testament manuscripts which share specific or generally related readings, which then differ from each other group, and thus the conflicting readings can separate out the groups. These are then used to determine the original text as published; there are three main groups with names: Alexandrian, Western, and Byzantine. The Caesarean text-type however (initially identified by biblical scholar Burnett Hillman Streeter) has been contested by several text-critics, such as Kurt and Barbara Aland. Textual critic Hermann von Soden classified it within his textual family I. Kurt Aland placed it in Category III of his New Testament manuscript classification system. Category III manuscripts are described as having "a small but not a negligible proportion of early readings, with a considerable encroachment of [Byzantine] readings, and significant readings from other sources as yet unidentified."

According to the Claremont Profile Method, it represents the textual family ƒ in Luke 1, Luke 10, and Luke 20 as a core member.

It lacks text of Matthew 16:2b–3. The text of Luke 22:43-44 is placed after Matthew 26:39, and the text of the Pericope Adulterae is placed after Luke 21:38.

History 
According to biblical scholar Caspar René Gregory, the manuscript was written in the 11th century, a dating adopted by the Institute for New Testament Textual Research. It was written in Calabria for a man named Leo and was added to the list of New Testament manuscripts by Gregory, who saw the manuscript in 1886.

It was formerly housed in the monastery Porta Panagia 26. The monastery is said to have been raided in 1823 by the Albanian Soultza Korutz, who after killing most of the monks took its treasures and burnt the library there, however there is a distinct lack of evidence about this supposed raid. Whatever the reason the manuscript left the monastery, it and several others were deposited in the National Library of Greece in Athens. In 1876, the manuscript was noticed as being mentioned in a catalogue of the manuscripts which were originally located at Porta Panagia. The manuscript is now housed at the National Library of Greece (74).

See also 

 List of New Testament minuscules
 Biblical manuscript
 Textual criticism
 Minuscule 787

References

External links 

 Digital images of Minuscule 788 (GA) at the CSNTM.

Greek New Testament minuscules
11th-century biblical manuscripts
Manuscripts of the National Library of Greece
Family 13